Long Island Plastic Surgical Group (LIPSG) was founded in April 1948 and is the oldest and largest private academic plastic surgery practice in the United States. The group currently has 11 offices within the New York Metropolitan area, including Garden City, East Hills, Babylon, Huntington, Manhattan, Flushing, Brooklyn, White Plains, and Connecticut. The practice operates with 24 plastic and reconstructive surgeons who were trained at institutions including Memorial Sloan–Kettering Cancer Center, Cleveland Clinic and Massachusetts General Hospital. LIPSG is composed of nine Centers of Excellence: Breast Reconstruction Surgery and Microsurgery; Burns and Complex Wound Management; Cosmetic Surgery of the Face, Breast, and Body; Facial Reanimation Treatment; Hand Surgery and Peripheral Nerve Repair; Non-Invasive Cosmetic Procedures; Pediatric Plastic and Craniofacial Surgery; Post-Weight Loss Cosmetic and Reconstructive Surgery; and Skin Care and Age Management.

Long Island Plastic Surgical Group surgeons are credited with improving the technique to restore function to facial muscles paralyzed by stroke and disease and discovering new uses and procedures for anti-aging treatments. The practice has also partnered with hospitals in projects such as the development of a nationally recognized burn center at Nassau University Medical Center (NuHealth), and the creation of the Cleft Palate and Craniofacial Center at North Shore University Hospital in Manhasset, New York. Within the practice, LIPSG oversees its own academic residency program in partnership with NUMC and Stony Brook Medicine. Graduates from the residency program have gone on to successful careers in both private practice and academia, and have become some of the leading innovators in the fields of plastic and reconstructive surgery.

History 
Long Island Plastic Surgical Group was established by Leonard R. Rubin and Richard H. Walden in April 1948 in Hempstead, New York. The practice grew through the 1950s, with Rubin and Walden offering a residency training program from 1954. During the 1960s, LIPSG founded the Nassau Cleft Palate Rehabilitation Center where all children born on Long Island with cleft lip and palate conditions were treated per an agreement with the State of New York. During this decade, Long Island Plastic Surgical Group surgeons also became the first to conduct studies on using pig skin in the treatment of burn victims at SUNY Downstate Medical Center. In 1967, Rubin co-founded the American Society of Aesthetic Plastic Surgery (ASAPS).

In the 1970s, LIPSG opened a specialty center devoted to facial reanimation treatment, where Rubin and fellow surgeons could continue the work and research outlined in his published article The Anatomy of a Smile in 1974. By 1978, Long Island Plastic Surgical Group relocated to Mineola, New York and became the first independent center to receive New York State accreditation and certification for its operating rooms. A decade later, LIPSG relocated its main office to a larger facility in Garden City, New York. During the 1990s, Long Island Plastic Surgical Group opened a medical spa, now known as Deep Blue Med Spa, which focuses on skincare and non-surgical cosmetic enhancement. Today, Deep Blue Med Spa treatments range from facials and chemical peels to fractionated laser resurfacing, skin tightening body treatments, and injectables. Deep Blue Med Spa has locations in LIPSG’s Garden City, East Hills, Babylon and Manhattan offices.

In the 2000s, the office expanded throughout New York and opened two new state-accredited operating rooms. In February 2008, LIPSG partnered with Nassau University Medical Center to oversee the $6.7 million renovation of a burn center with unique features such as a hyperbaric chamber for wound treatment. In 2009, LIPSG’s academic residency program became fully accredited and continues to serve as one of the nation’s only privately run, non-university based plastic surgery residency programs. In early 2010, LIPSG also launched 1-877-DR-STITCH, a 24-hour on-call service where LIPSG surgeons meet patients directly at the hospital emergency room or at a LIPSG office location to treat lacerations, complex wounds, broken noses, burns and facial trauma.

Recognizing that Long Island, NY has one of the highest rates of breast cancer in the United States, LIPSG has become highly involved in breast cancer initiatives in local areas. Long Island Plastic Surgical Group hosts the Annual Long Island Breast Cancer Summit featuring panels of medical experts and survivors discussing the latest innovations, treatments, and services for women who have breast cancer.

Awards 
 
LIPSG surgeons have received numerous honors and awards on a national and local level. As a practice, Long Island Plastic Surgical Group has won #1 Best Plastic Surgery Group for eleven years (2008–2016, 2018, 2019, 2021, 2022), Best BOTOX Practice and Best Laser Treatment Center for Aesthetic Center/Deep Blue Med Spa in the Best of Long Island Awards hosted by the Long Island Press. Notable awards for individual surgeons include:

 Newsweek’s list of America’s Best Plastic Surgeons for Barry K. Douglas, Laurence T. Glickman, Matthew S. Kilgo, Richard G. Reish, Frederick N. Lukash, Finny George, and Yoel A. Rojas.
 40 Under 40 Award for Noel Natoli by Long Island Business News.
 40 Under 40 Award for Yoel Rojas by Long Island Business News.
 Castle Connolly Top Doctors New York Metro Area for Roger Simpson, Leland Deane, Barry Douglas, Laurence Glickman, Thomas A. Davenport, Matthew S. Kilgo, Rachel Ruotolo, Tommaso Addona, Michael Dobryansky, Jerry Chang, Noel Natoli, George Xipoleas, Richard Reish, Brian Pinsky, Frederick Lukash, Haritha Veeramachaneni, Michael R. Christy, Finny George, Yoel Rojas, and Anke Ott Young. Castle Connolly Top Doctors is a peer-nominated award identifying doctors who exhibit excellence in their medical specialty.
 Best Cosmetic Surgeon for Leland M. Deane and Matthew Kilgo. The Long Island Press Best of Long Island Awards.
 Long Island Business News Health Care Heroes Award for Rachel Ruotolo. This award recognizes individuals for their humanitarian efforts within the medical field.
 U.S. News & World Report Top Doctors for Vincent R. DiGregorio and Roger L. Simpson. The U.S. News & World Report Top Doctor list is a partnership with Castle Connolly Ltd. recognizing Castle Connolly award recipients.
 Vitals Patients’ Choice Award 2012, 2014, 2017, 2018, 2019 for Tommaso Addona.

Dr. STITCH Service 
In 2010, Long Island Plastic Surgical Group launched 1-877-Dr. STITCH, a 24-hour on-call service where LIPSG surgeons meet patients directly at the hospital emergency room or at a LIPSG office location. The service provides immediate treatment for lacerations, complex wounds, broken noses, burns, facial trauma, and hand injuries. You can call Dr. STITCH 24 hours a day, 7 days a week, 365 days a year.

Deep Blue Med Spa 
Deep Blue Med Spa, formally known as Aesthetic Center, is a comprehensive medical spa staffed by licensed medical aestheticians, physician assistants, and nurse practitioners overseen by the surgeons at Long Island Plastic Surgical Group. The medical spa offers non-surgical elective cosmetic enhancement treatments to correct conditions on the face and body, remove unwanted body hair, eliminate spider veins, shape the body, and reduce the signs of aging, all with the goal of creating a more youthful appearance. Treatments include comprehensive skincare treatments, chemical peels, spider vein removal therapy, laser skin resurfacing, CoolSculpting, CoolTone, eyebrow services, Ulthera, Profound, Microneedling, and laser hair reduction. Deep Blue Med Spa also offers Long Island Plastic Surgical Group’s private label skincare line, ProBlueMD, which is and sold at the medical spa locations or online.

From 2011-2016, Deep Blue Med Spa was awarded "Best Laser Treatment Center" in the "Best of Long Island Awards" hosted by the Long Island Press. Additionally, LIPSG and Deep Blue Med Spa were awarded the "Best Botox Practice" in the 2022 Best of Long Island Awards.

References

External links 
Official site of Long Island Plastic Surgical Group
 
 
 

Plastic surgery organizations